Temple of Minerva (rarely ) may refer to:

In Rome
 Temple of Minerva (Aventine)
 Temple of Minerva Medica
 Temple of Minerva Medica (nymphaeum)
 Temple of Minerva Chalcidica
 Temple of Minerva (Forum of Nerva)

Elsewhere
 Temple of Minerva, Assisi, Italy
 Temple of Minerva (Guatemala)
 Temple of Minerva in Breno, Lombardy, Italy